N. Paul Divakar is a Dalit activist and former General Secretary of the National Campaign on Dalit Human Rights, based in Delhi. He was formerly the General Secretary of the Dalit Bahujan Shramik Union, a Dalit-Bahujan rights organisation in Andhra Pradesh.

References

Further reading
 

Indian civil rights activists
Living people
Telugu people
University of Madras alumni
Dalit activists
Year of birth missing (living people)